The Rabha, are a Tibeto-Burmese ethnic group inhabiting predominantly in the Northeast Indian states of Assam and Meghalaya and, some parts of West Bengal. They primarily inhabit the plains of Lower Assam and the Dooars, while some are found in the Garo Hills. Most of the Rabhas of Dooars refer to themselves as Rabha, but some of them often declare themselves as Kocha.

The Rabha community have a rich, multi-faceted and distinct culture of their own. The Rabha society is patrilineal . The village economy is based on agriculture and both men and women work in the fields. The women wear colorful clothes that they weave themselves and wear a lot of beads and silver ornaments. The Rabhas are non-vegetarians and rice is their staple food.

The traditional economy of the Rabhas in general, is based on agriculture, forest based activities and weaving. In the past, the Rabhas used to practice shifting cultivation. They continued to cultivate the land with Gogo or bill-hook. Later they took up the job of settled cultivation and started cultivation with plough. Besides cultivation, hunting was also an old practice of Rabha people. Weaving was a traditional occupation of the Rabha women.

The Rabhas are mostly found in Lower Assam on the south bank of the Brahmaputra, in the districts of Goalpara and Kamrup. Some are found in the north bank districts of Baksa, Udalguri and Kokrajhar. In Meghalaya, the Rabhas mainly live in West Garo Hills, East Garo Hills, North Garo Hills and South Garo Hills. In West Bengal, the Rabha inhabit the district of Alipurduar.

Language 
The Rabha language is  closely related to neighbouring Boro and Garo, as well as many other Sino-Tibetan languages of Assam. They have 11 dialects: Maithori, Rongdani, Pati, Dahori, Dotla, Halua,  Betolia, Hanna, Sunga, Modahi, Kocha Rabhas. These all are Rabhas but some of them have loss their mother tongues. Some of them have totally died out. But the Rongdani, Maithori and Kocha dialects are still used by Koch-Rabhas. The Rabha language is only spoken by a minority of the Rabhas, most of whom speak Assamese in Assam and Kamtapuri and Bengali in West Bengal.

See also
 Rabha language
 Rabha Hasong Autonomous Council
 Bishnuprasad Rabha
 Assamese language
 Himalayan Languages Project

Notes

References

Further reading 
 Saha, Rebatimohon (1987) "Jalpaiguri Jelar Koch-Rabha Samaj" (in Bengali) published in Ananda Gopal Ghosh edited Madhuparni, Special issue on Jalpaiguri District.
 Raha, M.K. (1974) "The Rabhas of Western Duars: Structural Analysis of a Changing Matrilineal Society", Bulletin of the Cultural Research Institute, Vol. 10 (1 & 2).
 Ghosh, Saumitra (1990) "Vanbasi Rabhara" (in Bengali) Desh, Vol 57 (12), January 20.
 Roy Choudhury, B. (1970) "Social Mobility Movement among the Rabhas of North Bengal", Man in India, Vol 50 (1).
 Gupta, Pabitra Kumar (1977) "Uttarbanger Rahba Samaj O Dharmasanskar Aandolon", (in Bengali) in Madhuparni: Special North Bengal Issue, 1977.
 Sarma, Dr. Nabin Ch (2006) "Oral Songs of Tribal Communities of Assam" a project of Assam Sahitya Sabha, Assam Institute of Research for Tribals and Scheduled Castes

Social groups of Assam
Tribes of Assam
Tribes of West Bengal
Sino-Tibetan-speaking people
Indigenous peoples of South Asia
Hindu ethnic groups
Social groups of West Bengal
Scheduled Tribes of Meghalaya
Scheduled Tribes of Assam
Scheduled Tribes of West Bengal
Ethnic groups in Northeast India
Ethnic groups in South Asia